A triptych (from the Greek adjective τρίπτυχον "tríptychon" ("three-fold"), from tri, i.e., "three" and ptysso, i.e., "to fold" or ptyx, i.e., "fold") is a work of art (usually a panel painting) that is divided into three sections, or three carved panels that are hinged together and can be folded shut or displayed open. It is therefore a type of polyptych, the term for all multi-panel works. The middle panel is typically the largest and it is flanked by two smaller related works, although there are triptychs of equal-sized panels. The form can also be used for pendant jewelry.

Beyond its association with art, the term is sometimes used more generally to connote anything with three parts, particularly if integrated into a single unit.

In art 

The triptych form appears in early Christian art, and was a popular standard format for altar paintings from the Middle Ages onwards. Its geographical range was from the eastern Byzantine churches to the Celtic churches in the west. During the Byzantine period, triptychs were often used for private devotional use, along with other relics such as icons. Renaissance painters such as Hans Memling and Hieronymus Bosch used the form. Sculptors also used it. Triptych forms also allow ease of transport.

From the Gothic period onward, both in Europe and elsewhere, altarpieces in churches and cathedrals were often in triptych form. One such cathedral with an altarpiece triptych is Llandaff Cathedral. The Cathedral of Our Lady in Antwerp, Belgium, contains two examples by Rubens, and Notre Dame de Paris is another example of the use of triptych in architecture. The form is echoed by the structure of many ecclesiastical stained glass windows.

The triptych form's transportability was exploited during World War Two when a private citizens' committee in the United States commissioned painters and sculptors to create portable three-panel hinged altarpieces for use by Christian and Jewish U.S. troops for religious services. By the end of the war, 70 artists had created 460 triptychs. Among the most prolific were Violet Oakley, Nina Barr Wheeler, and Hildreth Meiere.

The triptych format has been used in non-Christian faiths, including, Judaism, Islam, and Buddhism. For example: the triptych Hilje-j-Sherif displayed at the National Museum of Oriental Art, Rome, Italy, and a page of the Qur'an at the Museum of Turkish and Islamic Arts in Istanbul, Turkey, exemplify Ottoman religious art adapting the motif.  Likewise, Tibetan Buddhists have used it in traditional altars.

Although strongly identified as a religious altarpiece form, triptychs outside that context have been created, some of the best-known examples being works by Max Beckmann and Francis Bacon. When Bacon's 1969 triptych, Three Studies of Lucian Freud, was sold in 2013 for $142.4 million, it was the highest price ever paid for an artwork at auction at that time. That record was broken in May 2015 by $179.4 million for Pablo Picasso's 1955 painting Les Femmes d’Alger.

In photography 

A photographic triptych is a common style used in modern commercial artwork. The photographs are usually arranged with a plain border between them. The work may consist of separate images that are variants on a theme, or may be one larger image split into three.

Examples 
 Stefaneschi Triptych by Giotto, c. 1330
 Annunciation with St. Margaret and St. Ansanus by Simone Martini, 1333
 The Mérode Altarpiece by Robert Campin, late 1420's
 The Garden of Earthly Delights, Triptych of the Temptation of St. Anthony and The Haywain Triptych by Hieronymus Bosch
 The Portinari Altarpiece by Hugo van der Goes, c. 1475
 The Buhl Altarpiece, c. 1495
 The Raising of the Cross by Peter Paul Rubens, 1610 or 1611
 The Aino Myth triptych by Akseli Gallen-Kallela, 1891
 The Pioneer by Frederick McCubbin, 1904
 Departure by Max Beckmann, 1932–33
 Three Studies for Figures at the Base of a Crucifixion by Francis Bacon, 1944

Gallery

See also

References

External links 

 The Institution of the Eucharist at the Last Supper with St. Peter and St. Paul, Metropolitan Museum of Art
 On the triptych as a writing instrument
 Example of triptych features and restoration

Articles containing video clips
Altarpieces
Artistic techniques
Church architecture
Iconography
Optical illusions
Picture framing
Romanesque art
Rotational symmetry
Sculpture
Symmetry
Synagogue architecture
Triptychs
Visual motifs
Binocular rivalry